José Manuel Santisteban (born 27 September 1967), is a Spanish professional footballer who played as a goalkeeper and current Goalkeeping coach of Real Valladolid in La Liga.

Playing career
He started his professional football career in Bilbao Athletic as a Goalkeeper and played for second and third divisions in spain.

Coaching career
After retirement from playing career he worked as goalkeeping coach.

References

1967 births
Living people
Spanish footballers
Segunda División B players
Atlético Sanluqueño CF players
Xerez CD footballers
Recreativo de Huelva players
Barakaldo CF footballers
CD Logroñés footballers
CP Almería players
CD Mensajero players
CD Ourense footballers
Burgos CF footballers
Association football goalkeepers
Real Valladolid non-playing staff